Platanakia is a settlement  of the former municipality of Dio, which is part of the municipality of Dio-Olympos, in the Pieria regional unit, Central Macedonia, Greece. It is founded in 1954 by Greek refugees, coming from the Sea of Pontus.

The name Platanakia, comes by the agreement of the residents, because below the village, there are about 10 large trees which has been planted by a Sarakatsani farmer, years ago. The population of the village was 294 people as of 2011.

References

Notes
"Σαλπιγγίδης Πολύκαρπος, 50 χρόνια Πλατανάκια, εκδ. Δήμος Δίου"

Populated places in Pieria (regional unit)